"Fall" is a song by American rapper Eminem from his 2018 album Kamikaze. It was sent to Italian and UK contemporary hit radio on September 14, 2018, as the album's first single.

Content
The song features uncredited vocals by American singer Justin Vernon, who performed the chorus and was credited as one of the co-writers.
As other tracks from the album, "Fall" criticizes the contemporary hip-hop scene, dissing Joe Budden, DJ Akademiks and Tyler, the Creator, among others.

The slur used to describe Tyler, the Creator, "faggot", generated controversy, with fans writing against Eminem on social media, and some fellow recording artists, including Imagine Dragons' Dan Reynolds and Australian singer Troye Sivan, publicly criticizing his lyrics. Justin Vernon distanced himself from the song's message, claiming he was not in the studio while Eminem recorded his vocals, and revealing he asked Eminem's entourage to change it, without any result.
Interviewed by Sway, Eminem discussed his verses, claiming he knew he went "too far" with calling Tyler a "faggot", and apologized "because in my quest to hurt him, I realize that I was hurting a lot of other people by saying it".

Music video
On September 4, 2018, Eminem released a music video for the song, directed by James Larese. It was the first video to be released from Kamikaze. The video completely cut out the word "faggot" instead of having it back masked, like in the original song.

Track listing
Digital Download

Charts

Certifications

Release history

References

2018 songs
2018 singles
Songs written by Eminem
Songs written by Mike Will Made It
Songs written by Luis Resto (musician)
Songs written by Justin Vernon
Eminem songs
LGBT-related songs
Songs written by BJ Burton
Song recordings produced by Eminem
Song recordings produced by Mike Will Made It